Calm Before the Storm is the debut studio album by Canadian country music artist Paul Brandt, released in 1996 on Reprise Records. The album has been certified 3× Platinum by the CRIA and gold by the RIAA, and is his most successful album in the United States. Its four singles — "My Heart Has a History", "I Do", "I Meant to Do That", and "Take It from Me" — were all Number One hits on the Canadian RPM Country Tracks charts. All four singles were Top 40 hits on the U.S. Billboard Hot Country Singles & Tracks (now Hot Country Songs) charts, where they reached #5, #2, #39, and #38, respectively.

"Pass Me By (If You're Only Passing Through)" is a cover of a country standard which has been recorded by several artists, including Johnny Rodriguez, who released it as a single.

Track listing

Personnel
Mark Casstevens – acoustic guitar
Chad Cromwell – drums
Bill Cuomo – keyboards
Sonny Garrish – pedal steel guitar
Rob Hajacos – fiddle
John Hobbs – keyboards
Jeff King – electric guitar
Josh Leo – electric guitar
Brent Mason – electric guitar
Gary Morse – pedal steel guitar
Duncan Mullins – bass guitar
Steve Nathan – keyboards
Harry Stinson – background vocals
Biff Watson – acoustic guitar
Lonnie Wilson – drums
Glenn Worf – bass guitar
Woody Wright - background vocals
Jonathan Yudkin – fiddle

Strings arranged by Carl Marsh.

Charts

Weekly charts

Year-end charts

Certifications

References

External links
 [ allmusic.com]

Paul Brandt albums
1996 debut albums
Reprise Records albums
Albums produced by Josh Leo